Padang Kota is a state constituency in Penang, Malaysia, that has been represented in the Penang State Legislative Assembly since 1974. It covers George Town's historic city centre, including its old administrative core and the central business district (CBD) at Beach Street.

The state constituency was first contested in 1974 and is mandated to return a single Assemblyman to the Penang State Legislative Assembly under the first-past-the-post voting system. , the State Assemblyman for Padang Kota is Chow Kon Yeow from the Democratic Action Party (DAP), which is part of the state's ruling coalition, Pakatan Harapan (PH). Chow is also the current Chief Minister of Penang since 2018.

Definition

Polling districts 
According to the federal gazette issued on 30 March 2018, the Padang Kota constituency is divided into 14 polling districts.

This state seat encompasses the historic epicentre of George Town, including much of the city's UNESCO World Heritage Site. The colonial-era civic precinct, centred at Light Street, is home to a number of important landmarks, such as the Penang State Assembly Building (which houses the Penang State Legislative Assembly), the City Hall and the Esplanade (Malay: Padang Kota), from which the constituency got its name. Right next to this administrative heart of George Town is the city's CBD at Beach Street, where several international banks and financial services are based.

Other famous landmarks within this constituency include, but not limited to, Fort Cornwallis, Queen Victoria Memorial Clock Tower, St. George's Church, Church of the Assumption, Kapitan Keling Mosque, Kong Hock Keong Temple, Sri Mahamariamman Temple and Eastern & Oriental Hotel. In addition, the city's vital transportation hubs at Weld Quay, such as Swettenham Pier, the ferry terminal and the adjacent Rapid Penang public bus terminal, are situated within this state seat.

As well as the UNESCO World Heritage Site, the state seat also covers more modern parts of the city centre, especially around the vicinity of Northam Road. Jalan Pangkor and Jalan Perak form the constituency's western limits, while to the south, the Padang Kota constituency is bounded by (from west to east) Macalister Road, Jalan Zainal Abidin (formerly Yahudi Road), Burmah Road, Transfer Road, Campbell Street, Armenian Street, a mid-section of Beach Street and China Street Ghaut.

Demographics

History 
Due to its importance as the heart of George Town, the Padang Kota state constituency has become a key battleground for many of the top political leaders throughout Penang's modern history. For instance, the Padang at Esplanade serves as the main venue in George Town where large-scale political rallies are held; political heavyweights, such as Lee Kuan Yew, Lim Chong Eu and Lim Kit Siang have made crowd-pulling speeches in the past at the former parade ground. Notably, Lim Chong Eu, a founder of Gerakan, held this seat during his tenure as the Chief Minister of Penang between 1974 and 1990, only to lose the seat to Lim Kit Siang of the DAP in the 1990 State Election.

At the time of writing, the Padang Kota constituency has been held since 2008 by Chow Kon Yeow, who also holds the position of the DAP Penang State Chairman. In 2018, Chow became Penang's fifth Chief Minister, succeeding his party colleague, Lim Guan Eng.

Election results 
The electoral results for the Padang Kota state constituency in 2008, 2013 and 2018 are as follows.

See also 
 Constituencies of Penang

References 

Penang state constituencies